The Mendoza Open, or the Western Open, was a golf tournament on the TPG Tour, the official professional golf tour in Argentina. Founded in 1939, the first two events were held at the Andino Golf Club in Mendoza, Mendoza Province. The tournament was not played again until 1956, when it was held at the Club de Campo Golf Club in Mendoza, where it has remained except for 1993 and 2009, when the tournament was again played at Andino. In 2010 was played The YPF Classic in Golf Club Andino.

Winners

External links
TPG Tour – official site

Golf tournaments in Argentina